The NFL Top 100 Players of 2014 was the fourth season in the series. It ended with reigning NFL MVP Peyton Manning being ranked 1, while Super Bowl MVP Malcolm Smith was not ranked on the list.

Episode list

The list

References 

National Football League trophies and awards
National Football League records and achievements
National Football League lists